Enfield Lock  (No 13) is a lock on the River Lee Navigation, in the London Borough of Enfield. It gives its name to the surrounding area of Enfield Lock. The lock is situated close to the former Royal Small Arms Factory now known as Enfield Island Village. It is the first of the smaller locks upstream to Hertford which were built to allow barges up to a maximum 100 tons.

Etymology
Enfield Lock is recorded thus in 1710, earlier as Norhtlok 1355, The Locke 1657, 'the (northern) lock or river barrier (near Enfield)', from Middle English lok.

History 

A lock on this site has been extant since 1725. The present day structure was re-built in 1922. At the lock are red brick cottages and a Lee Conservancy Board toll office of 1889. Below the lock, a water maintenance depot, with clock turret on the cruciform planned office building of 1907.

Public access 

The lock is located adjacent to Ordnance Road.

Enfield Lock railway station is close by.

The area is served by the 491  and 121 London bus routes.

References

External links 

 Enfield Lock video
 London canals- Enfield Lock
 Enfield Lock - a history

Enfield, London
Locks of London
Geography of the London Borough of Enfield
Locks of the Lee Navigation